The Scottish Handball Association is the governing body for non-International Handball Federation related matters of team handball in Scotland while the British Handball Association has governance over matters relating to the International Handball Federation. The SHA is a member of the European Handball Federation (EHF) and the Commonwealth Handball Association (CHA).

History
The Association was formed in 1972

Scottish teams

 Armadale
 Ayr
 Broxburn
 Cumbernauld
 Dundee Handball Club
 EK82 Handball Club
 Edinburgh Eagles
 Falkirk
 Glasgow
 Gracemount Edinburgh Handball Club
 Kirkliston
 Liberton
 Linlithgow
 Livingston
 Na Feidh
 Troon
 Tryst 77
 Whitburn

Scottish National League champions

Scottish National Cup finals
Full details of past winners and the current season's fixtures/results can be found at the SHA Cup page.

Scottish League season 2009/10
The Scottish Handball League Championship Campaign commenced in October 2009. All league games will be played at Blackburn, West Lothian.

This year seven teams from across central Scotland will be taking part in the league campaign, for full details of results and fixtures see the Scottish Handball Season 2009/10 page.

The Scottish Cup Competition will be contested by 7 sides from across Scotland, with Ayr HC being replaced by Glasgow University HC. The 2009/10 season fixtures and results can be view on the SHA Cup page.

League table 2009/10

Scottish national team
The Scottish National squad have competed in the European Handball Federation Men's Challenge Trophy since 2005, and will enter a team into this year's tournament at the end of October 2009.

EHF Challenge Trophy
The Challenge Trophy is an International Handball Tournament held by the EHF for developing Handball Nations.

2005 EHF Men's Challenge Trophy
The 2005 tournament was held in Dublin, Ireland. Scotland finished in a respectable third place beating England in the play-offs.

Group stages
Scotland's fixtures were as follows:

Group table
The final standings after all group matches were completed was as follows

Third and fourth place play-off

Final standings

2007 EHF Men's Challenge Trophy
The 2007 Challenge Trophy took on a different format. There were 2 groups this time around, one with 4 teams with the group matches taking place in Georgia, and the other with 6 teams and the group matches taking place in Luxembourg. The winner of the two groups then faced each other in the Final, in Drammen, Norway.

Scotland were drawn in Group L, and played their matches in Luxembourg.

Group L
Scotland's fixtures were as follows:

Group L table
The final standings after all group matches were completed was as follows

2009 EHF Men's Challenge Trophy
Scotland will again compete in the EHF Men's Challenge Trophy with the group phase taking place between 30 October and 1 November 2009. This year's tournament consists of two groups, Group G1 being based in Moldova and Group G2 based in Malta, of 4 teams playing each other once in a round robin format with the winners of the group stages facing each other in the Final to be held in Linz, Austria.

Group G2
Scotland's fixtures were as follows:

Group G2 table

References

External links
 Scottish Handball Association Official site
 A Handball Blog with entries related to Scottish Handball
 European Handball Federation Official Site

Scotland
Handball
Handball governing bodies
Handball in Scotland
Sports organizations established in 1972
1972 establishments in Scotland